A ball terminal is a design feature of a typeface or glyph where the end of a stroke takes a roughly circular shape, as opposed to a serif or a square end.

External links
 "Ball terminal" at ParaType

Typography